I Kissed a Vampire is a 2009 rock musical (also known as a "vampirical") web series starring Lucas Grabeel, Drew Seeley, and Adrian Slade. It was adapted into a film of the same name in 2012, which premiered in March 2012 with music written by Frankie Blue, lyrics by Blue and Chris Sean Nolan, and a script by Laurie Nolan.

Plot
Dylan Knight (Lucas Grabeel) transforms into a vampire after being bitten by a bat. The film features him attempting to resolve conflict between his girlfriend, Sara Lane (Adrian Slade), and his vampire mentor neighbor, Trey Sylvania (Drew Seeley).

Cast
 Lucas Grabeel as Dylan Knight
 Drew Seeley as Trey Sylvania
 Adrian Slade as Sara Lane
 Amy Paffrath as Luna Dark
 Sally Slade as Sally Sucker
 Katie Seeley as Lydia Bloodworth
 Mike Slade as Dr. Payne
 Autumn Grabeel as Penny Plasma
 Emily Morris as Desiree Damned

Critical reception
A review from The Hollywood Reporter was negative, stating that the "script reads like a half-hearted attempt to get from one musical number to the next — forgivable, perhaps, if any of the songs were worth hearing. Our would-be Bieber and Britney do the best they can with risible material and choreography that will inspire pity from generous viewers — their song-and-dance interrupted by a couple of comic relief subplots so corny and overacted one imagines they’re leftover from a porn parody of vampire flicks. Production design and costumes are similarly low-grade."

Soundtrack

See also 
List of vampire television series

References

External links
 
 
 
 

2009 web series debuts
2012 films
2010s comedy horror films
2012 horror films
2010s musical films
American comedy horror films
American musical films
Musicals based on novels
Horror fiction web series
American comedy web series
Vampire comedy films
2012 comedy films
2010s English-language films
2010s American films